Dysphania littoralis, the red crumbweed, is a small, prostrate annual plant flowering year round.

References

External links

Online Field guide to Common Saltmarsh Plants of Queensland

littoralis